Marc Nelson (born January 23, 1971) is an American singer and songwriter. 
 
He was an original member of Boyz II Men while still attending Philadelphia's High School of Performing Arts. However, Nelson left the group to pursue a solo career before they released their first album.

Boyz II Men 

After hearing New Edition's song "Boys to Men" on the radio, the group changed their name to Boyz II Men. In 1989, the group met Michael Bivins and began making arrangements to sign the group to a major label and begin recording. In the interim, the group encountered delays in recording their album. Nelson grew impatient and left the group and began recording his debut solo project.

I Want You 
After signing a solo deal with Capitol Records, Nelson scored a hit with a cover of Marvin Gaye's "I Want You", which hit No. 26 on the R&B charts. His follow-up, "Count On Me", reached No. 48 on the R&B charts. Nelson released his solo album, I Want You, in 1991.

Following the release of his solo album, Nelson began concentrating his talents as a songwriter. Drawing the attention of Babyface, Nelson wrote for artists like Toni Braxton, Brandy, Tamia, Tyrese and Jon B. Through Babyface, Nelson met the four members of the group Az Yet and was added to the line-up as second lead vocalist; the group was signed to LaFace Records.

Az Yet 
As a member of Az Yet, Nelson found success. The group's self-titled debut album, released in 1996, went platinum. A single on the album, "Last Night", went gold and reached No. 9 on the Billboard Hot 100 chart. Their second single, "Hard To Say I'm Sorry" did even better, going platinum and reaching No. 8 on the Hot 100.

Chocolate Mood 
Nelson left Az Yet and began writing intensely. Subsequently, he released his second solo album, Chocolate Mood, in 1999. The album featured Nelson's biggest solo hit, 
"15 Minutes", which reached No. 4 on the R&B charts and No. 27 on the Billboard Hot 100. He also featured on the duet "After All is Said and Done" with Beyoncé, on the soundtrack to the motion picture The Best Man (1999).

On January 9, 2007, SESAC honored Nelson at their third Jazz Awards Luncheon, for his authorship on "It's On Tonight" by Brian Culbertson. The event honored jazz writers whose works achieved Top 5 status on the jazz charts from January 1, 2006 through December 31, 2006.

Marc: My Words 
Nelson released his first independent project, Marc: My Words (Lyric Masters 911) on July 24, 2007. Nelson wrote or co-wrote the lyrics on all 15 tracks of the album. He also produced or co-produced all of the tracks on the album. Nelson extracted the material for the release from his existing catalog of songs written between 2001 and 2007, and began recording the material in 2006. The album features the original version of "I Don't Wanna Be In Love" (co-written by jazz artist Brian Culbertson) which also appears on the 2007 release Crystal City by Andre Ward.

Blayse 
Nelson was also a founding member of the R&B super-group Blayse, with fellow R&B veterans Tony Grant of Az Yet, Gary "Lil G" Jenkins of Silk (group), and Terrell Phillips of Blackstreet. Although the group managed to record several songs, the recordings were never publicly released, the album was never completed, and the group disbanded in December 2007. Lil G returned to Silk, Nelson returned to Az Yet, and Tony Grant toured in the Tyler Perry stage production The Marriage Counselor (from January 2008 through May 2008).

Additional projects 
Nelson released the R&B/Soul single "Wishing You The Worst" on July 24, 2017. The song was released independently via his production company Focused Artist Entertainment.

Nelson was nominated for an Emmy Award, for penning the theme song to the 2016 animated Christmas television film Snowy Day. The title song was performed by Boyz II Men.

Discography

Studio albums

Contributions

Singles 
 "I Want You" (1991)
 "Count on Me" (1992) 
 "Last Night" with Az Yet (1996)  
 "Hard To Say I'm Sorry" with Az Yet & featuring Peter Cetera (1996) 
 "That's All I Want" with Az Yet (1997)
 "15 Minutes" (1999) 
 "Too Friendly" (2000) 
 "Love's Not Love" (2000)
 "Wishing You The Worst" (2017)

Stage play appearances 
 Love Ain't Supposed to Hurt - Part II: The Wedding
 Tell Hell I Ain't Coming
 King Solomon Lives
 Men Cry in the Dark
 In-Laws From Hell

References

External links
Marc Nelson's Official website

1971 births
Living people
21st-century African-American  male singers
African-American  male singer-songwriters
American contemporary R&B singers
American soul musicians
Musicians from Philadelphia
Singer-songwriters from Pennsylvania
Boyz II Men members
Az Yet members
Blayse members
Philadelphia High School for the Creative and Performing Arts alumni
20th-century African-American  male singers